Hickory Records is an American record label founded in 1954 by Acuff-Rose Music, which operated the label up to 1979. Sony Music Publishing (then Sony/ATV) revived the label in 2007. Originally based in Nashville, and functioning as an independent label throughout its history, it has had several distributors.

History

From its inception in 1955 to 1973, Hickory was distributed independently. MGM Records then distributed the label in 1973, and ABC Records began distributing it four years later. MCA Records inherited the ABC distribution deal when it bought ABC Records in 1979. The relationship between Acuff-Rose/Hickory and MCA turned sour shortly afterwards, so the Hickory label was discontinued, and its catalog was pulled when the distribution deal expired later in 1979.

In 1993, Scotti Bros. Records began reissuing the Hickory catalog.

The Hickory catalog is owned by Sony Music Publishing, which owns the Acuff-Rose catalogue, and the Hickory label was revived in 2007 with an album by Elliott Yamin. The output of the revived Hickory Records is distributed by Sony Music's RED Distribution unit.

Although Hickory began as a country music label, it signed some rock groups, such as Neal Ford and the Fanatics, The Sparkles (from Texas), and The Newbeats, as well as distributing a few UK Pye Records artists such as Donovan. Pye distributed Hickory in the UK. Among the hits that Hickory had on the pop charts were those by Sue Thompson, Kris Jensen, Donovan, and The Newbeats.

Hickory Records artists
Ernest Ashworth
Roy Acuff
Glenn Barber
Bill Carlisle
Helen Carter
 Jim Chesnut
Wilma Lee and Stoney Cooper
 The In-Crowd
Mark Dinning
Donovan
Jimmy Elledge
Don Everly
Neal Ford and the Fanatics
 Frankie & Johnny
Bob Gallion
Don Gibson
 B.J. Hickman
Frank Ifield
Kris Jensen
Bobby Lord
Bob Luman
Joe Melson
 Barbara Mills
Jim Mundy
The Newbeats
Mickey Newbury
The Overlanders
Rusty & Doug (prior to their Warner Records period)
 Randy and the Holidays
Buffy Sainte-Marie
Ruben Studdard
The Sparkles
Sue Thompson
Leona Williams
 Gail Wynters
Elliott Yamin

Notable releases 
 There's a Big Wheel by Wilma Lee & Stoney Cooper, released in 1959
 Fairytale by Donovan, released October 22, 1965
 Universal Soldier (written Buffy Sainte-Marie) by Donovan, released March 12, 1965
 The Real Donovan by Donovan, released September 1966
 Catch the Wind by Donovan, released March 12, 1965
 Colours by Donovan, released May 28, 1965 
 You'll Need Somebody on Your Bond by Donovan, released November 1965 
 To Try for the Sun by Donovan, released January 1966
 Josie by Donovan, released February 18, 1966
 Like It Is, Was, and Evermore Shall Be by Donovan, released April 1968
 A Girl For All Seasons by Gail Wynters, Hickory LPS 138
 Early Treasures by Donovan, released 1973
 Donovan P. Leitch by Donovan, released October 1970
 The Best of Donovan by Donovan, released November 1969
 What's Bin Did and What's Bin Hid by Donovan, released June 1965 as "Catch the Wind"
The Very Best of Don Gibson (album), released 1973
Louisiana Man by Rusty and Doug Kershaw, released 1974
Back In The Country by Roy Acuff, released 1974
Still Loving You by Bob Luman, released 1974
Smoky Mountain Memories by Roy Acuff, released 1974
The Girl I Love by Carl Smith, released 1975
Snap Your Fingers by Don Gibson, released 1974
Elliott Yamin by Elliott Yamin, released 2007
Love Is by Ruben Studdard, released May 19, 2009
Fight for Love by Elliott Yamin, released 2009

See also
 List of record labels

References

External links
 Hickory Records album discography
 Hickory Records on the Internet Archive's Great 78 Project

Record labels established in 1954
Record labels disestablished in 1979
Record labels established in 2007
Re-established companies
American independent record labels
Folk record labels
1954 establishments in Tennessee